Stoltenberg is a German surname. Notable people with the surname include:

Gerhard Stoltenberg (1928–2001), German politician and prime minister of Schleswig-Holstein
Thorvald Stoltenberg (1931-2018), Norwegian diplomat and former cabinet member
Jens Stoltenberg (born 1959; son of Thorvald), 13th Secretary General of NATO
Donald Stoltenberg (born 1927), American artist, author and teacher
John Stoltenberg (born 1944), American radical feminist activist and writer
Jason Stoltenberg (born 1970), Australian tennis player
Robert Stoltenberg (born 1965), Norwegian comedian
Abdi Farah Mude Stoltenberg, Somalian politician

See also
Stoltenberg (Norwegian family)

German-language surnames